The U'u is a war club of the Marquesas Islands.

Uses in Marquesas 
Cut from iron wood, its shape and large size distinguishes it from other Pacific gunstocks. It was reserved for a caste of warriors who were assisting allied tribes. The club should at least reach its possessor's armpits. The striking head, although apparently identical, was richly carved, and it is an artistic work with drawings representing lizards, human figures, or tattoo patterns. U'u’s were left in a taro field, where they turned black, then coated with coconut oil.

Gallery

References

Bibliography 
 John Charles Edler, Terence Barrow, Art of Polynesia, Hemmeter Publishing Corporation, 1990.
 Anthony JP Meyer, Art océanien, Könemann, 1995.

 
Clubs (weapon)
Primitive weapons
Ritual weapons